Graham Joseph Hill (born 8 July 1969) is an Australian theologian who is a Professor of Missiology and World Christianity at the Sydney College of Divinity. He is the State Leader of Baptist Mission Australia (Western Australia). Hill's research focuses on World Christianity but he is also known for his work on biblical egalitarianism and women theologians of global Christianity. He has published in the areas of missiology, applied theology, and global and ecumenical approaches to missional ecclesiology.

Education
In addition to undergraduate studies, Hill completed a Master of Theology at the University of Notre Dame Australia, and a Doctor of Philosophy (Ph.D) at Flinders University.

Career
Hill was involved in a church plant in 1988. He entered theological college for ministerial training in 1994 and received the Annual Theological Essay Award (Undergraduate Section) in 1996 for an essay titled "Augustine's Influence on Calvin, Zwingli and Luther." Hill was ordained and accredited by the Australian Baptist Churches in 2000. After church planting and pastoring in Sydney and Perth, Hill moved into theological education in 2004.

Hill was a lecturer at Burleigh Baptist Theological College in Adelaide from 2004 to 2006. Hill was a lecturer, Vice-Principal, and Provost of Morling College in Sydney from 2007–2019, a theological college affiliated with the Australian College of Theology and the University of Divinity. He presented at a 2013 Baptist World Alliance global gathering, and both the General Secretary and President of the Baptist World Alliance reviewed his books. Hill served as Interim Principal of Stirling Theological College (a member college of the University of Divinity) from February to November 2020, and Principal from December 2020 to March 2022. Hill was promoted to associate professor of the University of Divinity in 2020.

Hill served as a visiting scholar at the Korean Baptist Theological University and Seminary in South Korea in 2019. He delivered public lectures and seminars at that Baptist university, as well as at Torch Trinity Graduate University in Seoul, South Korea. He serves as an adjunct faculty member of Abilene Christian University in Texas, in their Doctor of Ministry program. On 7 March 2018, Hill was a keynote speaker at the Bible Society of Australia Church Leaders' Summit held at the InterContinental Hotel, Sydney. Hill's presentation on "trends in global Christianity and their impact on Australian church and society" was made to the Heads of all major Australian Christian denominations and organizations, and to the Governor-General of Australia, General David Hurley.

Hill reported struggling with alcoholism and depression while working as a church pastor, and stopped drinking alcohol in 2005.

Hill is the Founding Director of The Global Church Project. He is Chief Editor of the Australian Journal of Mission Studies. Hill is a research associate at the Center for the Study of Global Christianity (at Gordon-Conwell Theological Seminary in Hamilton, MA).

Personal life
Hill married Felicity Herbert on February 10, 1996 and they have three daughters.

Research 
Hill's first book explored ecumenical and missional approaches to Christian ecclesiology. This work was a revision of his PhD thesis, An Examination of Emerging-Missional Ecclesiological Conceptions: Missional Ecclesiology and the Ecclesiologies of Miroslav Volf, Joseph Ratzinger and John Zizioulas, and was published in 2012 by Cascade Books. Scot McKnight awarded the book the Jesus Creed Book of the Year in the category Church in 2012, writing "This is the most important book I have ever read on the church."

Hill's book Global Church: Reshaping Our Conversations, Renewing Our Mission, Revitalizing Our Churches was published by IVP Academic in 2016. Global Church and his research into global Christianity have been reviewed in Patheos, Christian Courier, Moody Bible Institute, and academic journals. Global Church was awarded an honorable mention in the 2015 IVP Academic Readers Choice Awards.

Hill's book Healing Our Broken Humanity: Practices for Revitalizing the Church and Renewing the World, co-authored with Grace Ji-Sun Kim, was named as a Resource of the Year - Culture by Outreach Magazine in 2019. The book was examined on ABC Radio National's Soul Search, with reference to its research into Asian Christianity, and the interview was broadcast on the ABC on 18 August 2019.

Hill's book Holding up Half the Sky: A Biblical Case For Women Leading and Teaching in the Church has been profiled by Scot McKnight.

Selected publications 

 
Hill, Graham Joseph (2013). Servantship: Sixteen Servants on the Four Movements of Radical Servantship. Eugene, OR: Cascade Books. ISBN 978-1620328248.
Hill, Graham Joseph (2015). Signs of Hope in the City: Renewing Urban Mission, Embracing Radical Hope. Melbourne: ISUM. ISBN 978-0992394110.

References

External links
 Official Author Website
 The Global Church Project

21st-century theologians
Living people
1969 births
Australian theologians
Academic staff of the University of Divinity
Flinders University alumni
University of Notre Dame Australia alumni